Julian Peedle-Calloo (born 1977) is a British actor, writer, director and television presenter, he has been deaf since birth, and is a presenter of the BBC deaf magazine programme See Hear.

Personal life
Julian Peedle-Calloo was born in Oxfordshire, England, in 1977, and has been Deaf since birth. He regards himself as being part of a linguistic minority, rather than identifying his deafness as a disability; British Sign Language is his first language, and English (written and spoken) is his second language. He can hear a little with a hearing aid, but rarely uses one. He graduated from the University of Wolverhampton with a 2:1 degree in electronic media in October 2000.

Career
Peedle-Calloo wrote and directed the 30-minute drama film Battle Lines (2014), about deaf people during the First World War, for online channel BSLZone. His other short films include 5 Needles (2011) and Confession (2012).

He is a presenter on deaf magazine programme See Hear.

As an actor, he has appeared in episodes of New Tricks and Holby City in 2012 and 2015 respectively.

References

External links

British television presenters
Deaf television presenters
Alumni of the University of Wolverhampton
Living people
1977 births
People from Oxfordshire
Deaf film directors
Deaf writers
Male deaf actors
BSL users
English deaf people
Television presenters with disabilities